The Roma Masters was a European Tour golf tournament which was played at Castelgandolfo, Rome, Italy in 1992 and 1993.

History
In 1992, the tournament took place in Castelgandolfo CC, Rome, Italy, from April 2–5. The prize fund was £225,000.

In 1993, the tournament took place in Castelgandolfo CC, Rome, Italy, from April 15–18. The prize fund was £300,000, which was below average for a European Tour event at that time.

Winners

References

External links
Coverage on the 1993 European Tour's official site

Former European Tour events
Golf tournaments in Italy
Sports competitions in Rome
Defunct sports competitions in Italy